Serbian Kingdom may refer to:

 Kingdom of Serbia (medieval), a Serbian kingdom during the 13th and 14th centuries
 Realm of Stefan Dragutin, the northern Serbian kingdom of 1282–1325 
 Lordship of Prilep, the southern Serbian kingdom of Marko Vukašinović (1371–1395) 
 Kingdom of Serbia (1718–39), a Habsburg province in central Serbia
 Kingdom of Serbia, the Serbian state from 1882 to 1918

See also
 Serbia (disambiguation)
 Principality of Serbia (disambiguation)
 Republic of Serbia (disambiguation)